In motor racing, the drag reduction system (DRS) is a form of driver-adjustable bodywork aimed at reducing aerodynamic drag in order to increase top speed and promote overtaking. It is an adjustable rear wing of the car, which moves in response to driver commands. DRS often comes with conditions, such as the requirement in Formula 1 that the pursuing car must be within one second (when both cars cross the detection point) for DRS to be activated.

DRS was introduced in Formula One in 2011. The use of DRS is an exception to the rule banning any moving parts whose primary purpose is to affect the aerodynamics of the car.

The system is also used in the Formula Renault 3.5 since 2012, Deutsche Tourenwagen Masters since 2013, Super Formula since 2014, GP2 Series later FIA Formula 2 Championship since 2015, GP3 Series later FIA Formula 3 Championship since 2017. An adjustable wing was also used by the Nissan DeltaWing at the 2012 24 Hours of Le Mans, although with free usage.

Formula One

In Formula One, the DRS opens an adjustable flap on the rear wing of the car, in order to reduce drag, thus giving a pursuing car an overtaking advantage over the car in front. When the DRS is deactivated or closed, it increases downforce, giving better cornering.

The device can only be used during a race after two racing laps have been completed, and when the pursuing car enters a designated "activation" zone defined by the FIA. This also includes having to wait 2 laps after a safety car restart.

In , the FIA increased the number of DRS zones to two on some circuits featuring multiple long straights. In Valencia and in Montreal, two zones were endorsed on consecutive long straights, while in Monza and in Buddh, two zones were created on separate parts of the circuit. Two zones had originally been planned for every race with multiple long straights from Montreal onwards (depending on Montreal/Valencia success), but this was not implemented. However, at the penultimate round of the 2011 season, two zones on consecutive long straights saw a return at Yas Marina.

When usage of the DRS remained legal for the  season, a second zone was added to the opening round's track in Melbourne. A third DRS zone was added during  and  seasons in Australia, Bahrain, Canada, Austria, Singapore, and Mexico. In the  season, a fourth zone was initially added for the track in Melbourne, after the circuit redevelopment, before being removed for safety reasons. In the  season the zone was re-added. Bahrain, Jeddah, Melbourne, Baku and Miami had their DRS zones adjusted based on whether the FIA deemed DRS made overtaking at these five circuits too easy or too hard in 2022.

Functional description
The horizontal elements of the rear wing consist of the main plane and the flap. This reduces opposition (drag) to airflow against the wing and results in less downforce. In the absence of significant lateral forces (straight line), less downforce allows faster acceleration and potential top speed, unless limited by the top gear ratio and engine rev limiter. Sam Michael, sporting director of the McLaren team, believes that DRS in qualifying will be worth about half a second per lap.

The effectiveness of the DRS will vary from track to track and, to a lesser extent, from car to car. The system's effectiveness was reviewed in 2011 to see if overtaking could be made easier, but not to the extent that driver skill is sidelined. The effectiveness of DRS seems likely to be determined by the level of downforce at a given circuit (where the cars are in low drag trim at circuits like Monza, the effects may be smaller), length of the activation zone, and characteristics of the track immediately after the DRS zone.

Rules on use 

Use of DRS is restricted by the F1 rules; it is permitted only when both:

 The following car is within one second of the car to be overtaken, which may be a car being lapped. The FIA may alter this parameter, race by race.
 The following car is in an overtaking zone as defined by the FIA before the race (commonly known as the DRS zone).

Further:

 The system may not be activated on the first two laps after the race start, restart, or a safety car deployment, for example, as was the case of the 2021 Belgian Grand Prix, during which no driver could have activated DRS because the entire race took place behind a safety car, before being terminated due to bad weather.
 The system cannot be used by the defending driver, unless within one second of another car in front.
 The system may not be enabled if racing conditions are deemed dangerous by the race director, such as rain, as was the case at the 2011 Canadian Grand Prix.

A dashboard light notifies the driver when the system is enabled (the driver can also see the system deploy in his wing mirrors). The system is deactivated when the driver releases the button or uses the brakes.

There are lines on the track to show the area where the one-second proximity is being detected (the detection point) and a line later on the track (the activation point), along with a sign vertically marked "DRS" where the DRS zone itself begins.

Reception 

There has been a mixed reaction to the introduction of DRS in Formula One amongst both fans and drivers. Some believe that this is the solution to the lack of overtaking in F1 in recent years while others believe this has made overtaking too easy. Former Formula One and Team Penske IndyCar Series driver Juan Pablo Montoya described it as "like giving Picasso Photoshop". The principal argument for the opponents of DRS is that the driver in front does not have an equal chance of defending his position because they are not allowed to deploy DRS to defend. The tightening up on the rules for a leading driver defending his position has added to this controversy. In 2018, then-Scuderia Ferrari driver Sebastian Vettel stated that he preferred throwing bananas 'Mario Kart Style' over the use of DRS.

Road car use
The McLaren P1 coupé is the first road car to have incorporated the F1-style rear wing Drag Reduction Systems. Porsche 911 (992) GT3 RS later followed suit by the introduction of the same system in 2022.

See also 

Kinetic energy recovery system (KERS)
Push-to-pass

References 

Formula One
Motorsport terminology